Nazim Dadaevich Ajiev (born 7 July 1967 in Frunze) is a former Kyrgyzstani football player.

Honours
SKA-PVO Bishkek
Kyrgyzstan League champion: 2002

References

External links
 

1967 births
Sportspeople from Bishkek
Living people
Soviet footballers
FC Kaisar players
FK Neftchi Farg'ona players
FC Orenburg players
Kyrgyzstani footballers
Kyrgyzstan international footballers
First Professional Football League (Bulgaria) players
OFC Pirin Blagoevgrad players
Kyrgyzstani expatriate footballers
Expatriate footballers in Bulgaria
FC Shakhter Karagandy players
Expatriate footballers in Kazakhstan
FC Lokomotiv Nizhny Novgorod players
Russian Premier League players
Expatriate footballers in Russia
FC Alga Bishkek players

Association football forwards